This is a list of Ruby-Spears productions, including television series in animation and live-action.

Most of the original pre-1991 library of R-S Enterprises is currently held by Warner Bros. Discovery's Warner Bros. Television Studios thru Hanna-Barbera Cartoons, Warner Bros. Animation and Warner Bros. Family Entertainment.

Main list

Television series

Television specials

The Puppy series

Miss Switch series

Rose Petal Place series

Alvin and the Chipmunks series

Other standalone specials

Hanna-Barbera Classics Collection 
The Hanna-Barbera Classics Collection (once called the Hanna-Barbera Golden Collection, later called the Hanna-Barbera Diamond Collection) is a series of two-to-four-disc DVD box sets from Warner Home Video and later by Warner Archive, usually containing complete seasons and complete series of various classic Hanna-Barbera (with MGM Cartoons and Ruby-Spears) cartoons (along with the television movies and specials). The line began in March 2004.

Warner Archive releases

2010 
Thundarr the Barbarian: The Complete Series (December 17, 2010) (Ruby-Spears)

2011 
 Chuck Norris: Karate Kommandos: The Complete Series (April 1, 2011) (Ruby-Spears)
 Mister T: The Complete First Season (May 10, 2011) (Ruby-Spears)
 Dragon's Lair (September 20, 2011) (Ruby-Spears)

2015 
 Centurions: Part 1 (July 21, 2015) (Ruby-Spears)

2016 
 Centurions: Part 2 (March 15, 2016) (Ruby-Spears)

2017 
 Dink, the Little Dinosaur: The Complete Series (October 10, 2017) (Ruby-Spears)

Lists of animation
productions